The Theatre Nuovo Teatro Giuseppe Verdi of Brindisi, Italy was inaugurated on December 20, 2006, with a concert directed by Maestro Riccardo Muti. Since 2022 Maestro Stefano Miceli is the chairman of the theatre foundation.

Structure
The theatre is located in the city center of Brindisi, and has a surface area of 4500 square meters, and a volume of 40 thousand cubic meters. Along the bottom of the main hall (738 seats) are two tunnels (respectively 351 and 83 admissions). The total capacity is 1172 seats. The whole theatre is adapted to the needs of people with disabilities. The stage is one of the largest in Italy, being 25.50 m wide, 18 m high and 20 m deep.

References

Theatres in Apulia
Teatro Verdi
Teatro Verdi
Theatres completed in 2006